Brigadier General Salih Rajab al-Mismari was a Libyan politician and general in the Libyan army who served as Secretary of the General People's Committee of Libya for Public Security during the Gaddafi regime from 2006 to 2011.

In May 2018, Rajab was among the high-profile Gaddafi loyalists who declared their support for Khalifa Haftar at a forum in Benghazi.

Notes

Living people
Members of the General People's Committee of Libya
Libyan generals
People of the First Libyan Civil War
Year of birth missing (living people)
Place of birth missing (living people)